The 2021 Finnish Cup is the 66th season of the Finnish Cup football competition.
 
Until the 2017–2018 season, the tournament was held in the autumn-spring schedule from July to September of the following year. The introduction of this new format of the contest meant that the League Cup was suspended.

The winner of the Finnish Cup qualifies for the 2022–23 UEFA Europa Conference League.

Teams

Group stage 
The teams participating in the Group Stage were the teams of Veikkausliiga and Ykkönen. The group stage was played in February 2021 with teams divided into 6 divisional groups, three groups with Veikkausliiga and three groups with Ykkönen teams. The winners of the Veikkausliiga groups qualify for the quarter-finals, the second teams of these groups will play the playoffs. The winners and the best 2 runners up of the Ykkönen groups qualify for the playoffs.

Veikkausliiga – Group A

Veikkausliiga – Group B

Veikkausliiga – Group C

Ykkönen – Group A

Ykkönen – Group B

Ykkönen – Group C

Play-off Round 
In the playoff round, 2 teams from Kakkonen (PEPO and SJK Akatemia), wil enter the tournament.

Quarter-finals

Semi-finals

Final

References

External links
Official page 

Finland - List of Cup Finals, RSSSF.com

Cup 2021-22
Finnish Cup seasons
Finland